Sundre Airport  is located  southwest of Sundre, Alberta, Canada.

See also
Sundre/Goodwins Farm Airport

References

External links
Place to Fly on COPA's Places to Fly airport directory

Registered aerodromes in Alberta
Mountain View County